Delta South Senatorial District in Delta State, Nigeria, covers 8  local governments which comprise Bomadi, Burutu, Isoko North, Isoko South, Patani, Warri North, Warri South and Warri South West.  The headquarters (collation centre) of Delta South is Isoko South Local Government. The current representative of Delta South Senatorial District is James Manager of the People’s Democratic Party, PDP.

List of senators representing Delta South

References 

Politics of Delta State
Senatorial districts in Nigeria